Tagaria was a Roman-Berber town in the province of Africa Proconsularis and in Late Antiquity of Byzacena. It was located in the Sahel area in Tunisia.

The town was also the seat of an ancient bishopric, which remains a titular see of the Roman Catholic Church. The current bishop is Novatus Rugambwa, who succeeded José Benedito Simão in 2010.

References
Roman towns and cities in Africa (Roman province)